When Obscenity Becomes the Norm...Awake! is the debut studio album by American thrash metal band Angkor Wat, released in April 1989 by Metal Blade Records.

Track listing

Personnel 
Adapted from the album's liner notes.

Angkor Wat
David Brinkman – vocals
Adam Grossman – guitar, illustrations, design, photography
Danny Lohner – guitar
Dave Nuss – drums, design
Mike Titsworth – bass guitar

Production and additional personnel
Angkor Wat – production
Kerry Crafton – production, engineering, design
Wendy – design

Release history

References

External links 
 

1989 debut albums
Angkor Wat (band) albums
Metal Blade Records albums